Term Diocese of Prizren may refer to:

 Roman Catholic Diocese of Prizren, former diocese of Catholic Church, that existed until 1969
 Roman Catholic Diocese of Skopje and Prizren, former diocese of Catholic Church, that existed from 1969 to 2000
 Apostolic Administration of Prizren, a territorial circumscription of Catholic Church, that was an apostolic administration from 2000 to 2018
 Roman Catholic Diocese of Prizren-Priština, current diocese of Catholic Church, which in 2018 reconstituted the diocese that existedhistorically.
 Serbian Orthodox Diocese of Prizren, former eparchy of Serbian Orthodox Church, that existed until 1818
 Serbian Orthodox Diocese of Raška and Prizren, current eparchy of Serbian Orthodox Church

See also
Prizren
Catholic Church in Serbia
Eastern Orthodoxy in Serbia
Catholic Church in Kosovo
Eastern Orthodoxy in Kosovo
Diocese of Skopje (disambiguation)